Jay Reynolds is a Grammy Award Winning mixer, record producer, songwriter and musician.  He is best known for his work with Dua Lipa, Headie One, Fred Again.., Just Jack, Pixie Lott, Paloma Faith, McFly, Ella Eyre, The Strypes, The Hoosiers, The Vamps, Shack, Hudson Taylor, Aston Merrygold, Bipolar Sunshine, Jamie N Commons and  Aurora.

Jay is currently producing and mixing albums/singles for Nines, Stormzy, AJ Tracey, Mabel, James Blunt, Tom Walker, Griff, Liam Gallagher, Crystal Fighters, MIST, Black Saint, Steel Banglez, Demi Lovato, Kylie Minogue, Catherine McGrath, and Rationale. Jay has mixed tracks with features from Flo Rida, MØ, Mostack, Jessie Ware, Not3s, Fredo and Nines.

Long Island Studios
Currently Jay has 2 mixing rooms at LA Sound Studios, Acton, London.
He has a fully certified Dolby Atmos mixing room using a Genelec 7.2.4 speaker system.

He is represented by JAX Management.

References

External links
 Spotify Playlist
Discography - Jax Management

English record producers
British audio engineers
Living people
Year of birth missing (living people)